This is the discography of rapper Hussein Fatal.

Albums

Solo albums

In the Line of Fire (March 24, 1998, Relativity) - chart position: 50 U.S.
Fatal (November 19, 2002, Rap-A-Lot/Asylum Records)
Born Legendary (June 16, 2009, Thugtertainment)
The Interview: It's Not a Gimmik 2 Me (February 13, 2013, Thugtertainment)
Ridin' All Week on 'Em (February 28, 2015,  Thugtertainment)
Legendary Status (July 10, 2018, Hussein Entertainment)

Collaboration albums
With Young Noble - Thug in Thug Out (September 11, 2007, High Powered Entertainment, Thugtertainment, 1Nation & Koch Records)
With Nutt-So - Outkasted Outlawz (October 5, 2010, Nutty's Playhouse Entertainment, Thugtertainment)
With Outlawz - Perfect Timing (September 13, 2011, Krude Productions Inc.)
With Young Noble - Jerzey Giantz (March 17, 2014, Outlaw, Thugtertainment)
With T-Dhurr - Frapaveli EP (July 18, 2015, TriangularMarketProd, Thugtertainment)

Official mixtapes

Singles

Solo

As featured performer
2005: "Rain on Me (Remix)" (Ashanti feat. Ja Rule, Charli Baltimore & Hussein Fatal)
2007: "Move Over" (Hydro feat. Rock City & Hussein Fatal)

Guest appearances

References

Hip hop discographies
Discographies of American artists